Freddy Quinn (born Franz Eugen Helmut Manfred Nidl; 27 September 1931) is an Austrian singer and actor whose popularity in the German-speaking world soared in the late 1950s and 1960s.  As Hans Albers had done two generations before him, Quinn adopted the persona of the rootless wanderer who goes to sea but longs for a home, family and friends.  Quinn's Irish  family name comes from his Irish-born salesman father, Johann Quinn. His mother, Edith Henriette Nidl, was an Austrian journalist.  He is often associated with the Schlager scene.

Biography
Quinn was born in Niederfladnitz, Lower Austria, and grew up in Vienna. As a child he lived in Morgantown, West Virginia, with his father, but moved back to live with his mother in Vienna. Through his mother's second marriage to Rudolf Anatol Freiherr von Petz, Quinn adopted the name Nidl-Petz.

At the end of World War II, as part of a refugee group, Quinn encountered American troops in Bohemia. Due to his fluent English, the 14-year-old succeeded in pretending to be of American nationality. He was subsequently sent to the US in May 1945 with a military transport. On Ellis Island, he learned that his father had already died in 1943 in a car accident. The boy was immediately sent back to Europe and, before returning to his mother in Vienna, was stranded for a whole year in Antwerp in a children's home, where he learned to speak French and Dutch.

However, having left the landlocked country of Austria in favor of adventurous journeys through Southern Europe and Northern Africa, he eventually headed for Germany. He was "discovered" in St. Pauli, Hamburg, and was offered his first recording contract in 1954. He represented Germany at the Eurovision Song Contest 1956 in Lugano, Switzerland, with the atypical song, "So geht das jede Nacht", about an unfaithful girlfriend who dates many men. He did not win, and the full results of the contest were never released so his placement is not known. Most of his other songs are about Hamburg, the endless sea and the solitary life in faraway lands. His first hit record was "Heimweh" ("Homesickness", a.k.a. "Brennend heisser Wüstensand", "Dort wo die Blumen blüh'n" and "Schön war die Zeit", (1956), a German version of Dean Martin's "Memories Are Made of This". It sold over one million copies, and was awarded a gold disc.

Other hits, often with him simply billed as Freddy, followed: "Die Gitarre und das Meer" (1959), "Unter fremden Sternen" (1959), "Irgendwann gibt's ein Wiedersehn" (1960), "La Paloma" (1961), "Junge, komm bald wieder" (1962). His 1964 offering "Vergangen, vergessen, vorüber" was another million-selling release.

His popularity waned in the 1970s, but Quinn continued performing. "Junge, komm bald wieder" was sung by Alpay on 7 Dilde Alpay (Turkish for "Alpay in Seven Languages") album, which was released in 1973.

Starting in the late 1950s, Quinn also acted in several movies, again frequently cast as the seafaring loner. Titles include Freddy, the Guitar and the Sea (1959), Freddy unter fremden Sternen (1959), Freddy and the Song of the South Pacific (1962), and Homesick for St. Pauli (1963). Subsequently, Quinn also performed on the stage in such diverse roles as Prince Orlofsky in Die Fledermaus, the king in The King and I, and Lord Fancourt Babberly in Charley's Aunt.

Quinn was also an accomplished circus performer who stunned television audiences as a tightrope walker, performing live and without a safety net. On another occasion, which was also televised, he rode a lion inside a circus cage while the lion was balancing atop a moving surface.

Quinn lives in Hamburg.

Selected filmography
 The Big Chance (1957)
 Freddy, the Guitar and the Sea (1959)
 Freddy and the Melody of the Night (1960)
 Only the Wind (1961)
 Freddy and the Millionaire (1961)
 Freddy and the Song of the South Pacific (1962)
 Homesick for St. Pauli (1963)
 Freddy in the Wild West (1964)
 The Roaring Fifties (1983)

Selected song list

 This list only contains songs that have been covered by Freddy Quinn or others.
 The year lists when a song was recorded for the first time.

References

External links

 
 A Freddy Quinn fan page 
 An Irish based Freddy Quinn fan page

1931 births
Living people
People from Hollabrunn District
20th-century Austrian male singers
Austrian male film actors
20th-century Austrian male actors
Schlager musicians
Maritime music
Eurovision Song Contest entrants for Germany
Eurovision Song Contest entrants of 1956
Officers Crosses of the Order of Merit of the Federal Republic of Germany
Austrian people of Irish descent
Austrian circus performers